Marina Melnikova and Eva Wacanno were the defending champions but chose not to participate.

Estelle Cascino and Camilla Rosatello won the title, defeating Liang En-shuo and Yuan Yue in the final, 6–3, 6–2.

Seeds

Draw

Draw

References
Main Draw

Open Montpellier Méditerranée Métropole Hérault - Doubles